Joseph A. Adesunloye is British-Nigerian filmmaker, TV director and writer known for his 2016 feature film White Colour Black.

Career 
In 2017, Joseph was longlisted ‘Best Debut Screenwriter’ for the prestigious BIFA Awards (British Independent Film Awards) where his film White Colour Black  was longlisted for a total of two Awards including the category of ‘Most Promising New Comer’ for the film's star Dudley O’Shaughnessy.  

White Colour Black was also nominated at the 2017 BFI London Film Festival and Adesunloye for the BFI IWC Schaffhausen Filmmakers Bursary Award 2016. White Colour Black appeared at the Baltimore International Black Film Festival 2017 winning for Best International Feature and Best Narrative Feature. Adesunloye received the Oscar Micheaux Award for directing.

He is currently completing postproduction work on his second feature film Faces which stars Terry Pheto

Filmography 
 2020 Writing Africa (Short)
 2019 2064 (Short) (as Joseph Adesunloye)
 2018 Faces
 2017 46 (Short)
 2016 White Colour Black
 2014 Beyond Plain Sight (Short)
 2013 Tangle (Short)
 2012 Labalaba, He'll Return (Short)
 2007 Shadowed (Short) (as Joseph Adesunloye)

References 

Living people
British film directors
Nigerian film directors
British television directors
Nigerian television directors
British television writers
Nigerian television writers
Alumni of the University of Aberdeen
Year of birth missing (living people)
Place of birth missing (living people)
Black British filmmakers